The diplomatic reception rooms at the U.S. Department of State constitute forty-two principal rooms and offices where the secretary of state conducts the business of modern diplomacy. Located on the seventh and eighth floors of the Harry S Truman Building in Washington, D.C., the diplomatic reception rooms contain one of the nation’s foremost museum collections of American fine and decorative arts.

Architect Edward Vason Jones designed several of the rooms between 1965 and 1980. Clement Conger, curator of the collections from 1961 to 1990, assembled many of the art, furniture, and decorative arts objects.

Guided tours of the diplomatic reception rooms are available by appointment. Admission is free. Tours can be scheduled online.

Management
Three teams at the State Department collaborate on the use of the receptions rooms. The Office of the Chief of Protocol administers official visits by guests of the secretary. The facilities themselves are managed by the Bureau of Administration, while their contents are managed by the Office of Fine Arts, an office that is headed by the Director of the Diplomatic Reception Rooms. Both report to the under secretary of state for management.

8th floor
The Entrance Hall. Designed by Edward Vason Jones.
The Gallery. Designed by Edward Vason Jones, 1965.
Thomas Jefferson State Reception Room. Used for entertaining, it measures . Designed by Edward Vanson Jones, completed October 4, 1974.
Edward Vason Jones Memorial Hall. Elevator lobby, designed by Edward Vason Jones.
John Quincy Adams State Drawing Room. The first of the reception rooms renovated, it measures . Designed by Edward Vanson Jones, completed May 16, 1972.
Benjamin Franklin State Dining Room. Designed by John Blatteau, completed March 8, 1985. It is used for the grandest of occasions, such as State Dinners and swearing-in ceremonies.
Martha Washington Ladies' Lounge.
Walter Thurston Gentlemen's Lounge. Designed by Walter M. Macomber, completed November 6, 1981.

7th floor
Treaty Room Suite. Three connected rooms used for ceremonial occasions. The center one is elliptical. 
Secretary of State's Office. Designed by Allan Greenberg, 1987-89.
Deputy Secretary of State's Office. Designed by Allan Greenberg, completed December 1, 1989.
James Monroe Conference Room.
James Monroe Foyer and Hallway.
James Madison Dining Room. Used for intimate meals.
Martin Van Buren Sitting Room.
Henry Clay Dining Room.
Robert Livingston Executive Dining Room.

Collections
Masterpieces in the collections are assembled from the early Federal period, c. 1790-1815. These masterpieces are interwoven into an interpretative narrative that explores U.S. diplomatic history: charting of the new world and the colonial foundations, the nation’s road to independence and birth of the United States, and expansion westward over the years 1740-1840.
The Diplomatic Reception Rooms are a national treasure that belongs to the American people. It is the People that support the vital activities of the Diplomatic Reception Rooms. Charitable contributions from private citizens, foundations, and corporations support revitalization and expansion initiatives, collections maintenance and conservation, and educational programming.

On September 3, 1783, the Treaty of Paris, establishing peace with Great Britain after the American Revolutionary War, was signed on this Tambour Writing Table. This diplomatic achievement is depicted in the collection’s unfinished painting, after Benjamin West’s 1782 original, “The American Commissioners of the Preliminary Peace Negotiations with Great Britain.” Hand-wrought silver by patriot-silversmith Paul Revere, porcelain wares from George Washington’s Society of Cincinnati, and companion portraits of John Quincy and Louisa Catherine Adams, 1816, by artist Charles Robert Leslie are among the national treasures.

References

 Conger, Clement E. and Alexandra W. Rollins. Treasures of State: Fine and Decorative Arts in the Diplomatic Reception Rooms of the U.S. Department of State. New York: Harry N. Abrams, Inc., 1991.
 Ward, Gerald W.R., ed. Becoming a Nation: Americana from the Diplomatic Reception Rooms U.S. Department of State. New York: Rizzoli, 2003.

Further reading
 www.MuseumsUSA.org
 For Kids Ages 12 and Up Beth Rubin, Frommer's Washington D.C. with Kids, Part Three. www.googlebooks.com. Retrieved 2011-01-12.

External links

The Diplomatic Reception Rooms Official Website
Reception Room Tours - U.S. Department of State (Official tour information page)
Official U.S. Department of State Flickr Gallery of the Reception Rooms Collection

United States Department of State
Individual rooms in Washington, D.C.